The River Suir Bridge is a cable-stayed bridge over the River Suir in Ireland. It was built as part of the N25 Waterford Bypass, and opened to traffic on 19 October 2009, some ten months ahead of schedule. The Viking settlement at Woodstown was discovered during the project and the route of the southern approach roads was altered to preserve the site.

The 230 metre main span had the longest single bridge span in the Republic of Ireland, until the opening of the Rose Fitzgerald Kennedy Bridge, taking that record from the Boyne River Bridge on the Dublin to Belfast M1 motorway. By comparison, the main span of the Foyle Bridge in Northern Ireland is four metres longer.

Overview
The cable-stayed bridge with its 112 metre tall tower, is a landmark structure for Waterford City and surrounding areas. The tower is constructed on the south side of the river. A series of "stay cables" fan out from the top of the tower to support the main span at intervals of about 10 metres. Corresponding cables fan to the back spans using the weight of the back span and anchor piles to balance the forces and "keep the tower standing straight".

Other bridges at Waterford City
 The first permanent bridge at Waterford City was the so-called "Timbertoes" bridge (1793-1913)
 It was replaced by the Redmond Bridge (1910-1984)
 The current city-centre bridge is the Rice Bridge (1982–present)
 The River Suir Bridge marks the first time Waterford city has been served by two bridges

Gallery

See also
Roads in Ireland
Atlantic Corridor
List of Ireland-related topics

References

Buildings and structures in County Waterford
Bridges in County Kilkenny
Cable-stayed bridges in Ireland
Bridges completed in 2009
Toll bridges in the Republic of Ireland
21st-century architecture in the Republic of Ireland